Daniel James III (September 7, 1945 – August 1, 2017) was a lieutenant general in the United States Air Force who served as the director of the Air National Guard from June 3, 2002, to May 20, 2006.

Biography
James was born in Tuskegee, Alabama, in 1945., his father was Air Force General Daniel "Chappie" James Jr. He held a Bachelor of Arts degree in psychology from the University of Arizona, Tucson, and graduated from the Air Command and Staff College in 1981 and the National Security Management Course in 1992.

James flew 500 combat hours in Southeast Asia and earned two Distinguished Flying Crosses. He was the first African American to become the director of the Air National Guard. He retired from the United States Air Force in June 2006.

He died on August 1, 2017, of congestive heart failure. He received both Baptist and Catholic funeral services and was interred at Arlington National Cemetery.

Major awards and decorations

Other awards
Order of the Sword (United States) # 221
Texas Military Hall of Honor

Assignments
 June 1968 – June 1969, student, undergraduate pilot training, Williams Air Force Base, Arizona
 June 1969 – August 1970, forward air controller, Cam Ranh Bay Air Base, South Vietnam
 August 1970 – July 1972, squadron instructor pilot, Williams AFB, Arizona
 July 1972 – February 1973, squadron flight training class commander, Williams AFB, Arizona
 February 1973 – December 1973, air operations staff officer, Headquarters U.S. Air Force, Washington, D.C.
 December 1973 – June 1974, U.S. Air Force conversion training course, George AFB, California
 June 1974 – May 1975, 421st TFS squadron instructor pilot and assistant flight commander, Udorn Royal Thai AFB, Thailand
 May 1975 – August 1976, 64th FWS Aggressor instructor pilot, Nellis AFB, Nevada
 August 1976 – September 1978, 65th FWS Aggressor instructor pilot and squadron flight commander, Nellis AFB, Nevada
 September 1978 – September 1979, weapons tactics officer, 149th Tactical Fighter Group, Texas Air National Guard, Kelly AFB, Texas
 September 1979 – March 1982, group pilot, later, unit pilot, 182nd Tactical Fighter Squadron, Kelly AFB, Texas
 March 1982 – December 1983, unit commander, 182nd Tactical Fighter Squadron, Kelly AFB, Texas
 December 1983 – October 1988, Commander, A flight, 182nd Tactical Fighter Squadron, Kelly AFB, Texas
 October 1988 – October 1989, pilot, C flight, 182nd Tactical Fighter Squadron, Kelly AFB, Texas
 October 1989 – December 1992, command post assistant officer-in-charge, later, command post officer-in-charge, 149th Tactical Fighter Group, Kelly AFB, Texas
 December 1992 – December 1994, Vice Commander, 149th Tactical Fighter Wing, Kelly AFB, Texas
 December 1994 – November 1995, Commander, 149th Operations Group, Kelly AFB, Texas
 November 1995 – June 2002, Adjutant General, Headquarters Texas National Guard, Austin
 June 2002 – 2006, Director, Air National Guard, Arlington, Virginia

References

Further reading

External links
 Maj. Lt. Gen. Daniel James III United States Air Force Bio 

1945 births
2017 deaths
United States Air Force generals
Recipients of the Legion of Merit
Recipients of the Air Medal
Recipients of the Air Force Distinguished Service Medal
Recipients of the Distinguished Flying Cross (United States)
Recipients of the Order of the Sword (United States)
University of Arizona alumni
African-American United States Air Force personnel
Burials at Arlington National Cemetery
21st-century African-American people
African Americans in the Vietnam War
African-American Catholics
People from Tuskegee, Alabama